Black Europeans of African ancestry, or Afro-Europeans, refers to people in Europe who trace full or partial ancestry to Sub-Saharan Africa.

European Union 

In the European Union (EU) as of 2019, there is a record of approximately 9,6 million people of Sub-Saharan African or Afro-Caribbean descent, comprising around 2% of the total population, with over 50% located in France. The countries with the largest African population in the EU are:

The remaining 14 states of the European Union have fewer than 100,000 individuals of Sub-Saharan African descent all together. As countries such as Poland, Hungary, Czech Republic, Romania and Greece have received little to no immigration from Sub-Saharan Africa or interaction that would have caused the formation of black or mixed race communities. Black populations, inclusive of descendants, mixed race people, and temporary students, number fewer than 10,000 in each of these states.

Other European countries 
The United Kingdom has approximately 2,5 million black people, inclusive of mixed race, according to the 2011 Census. Black people from the EU who have settled in the UK are also included such as the Black Anglo-Deutsch. Switzerland and Norway have 114,000 and 115,000 people of Sub-Saharan African descent, respectively; primarily composed of refugees and their descendants, but this is only the numbers for first generation migrants and second generation migrants with two parents from a different country. There are no official numbers in Norway regarding Afro-Norwegians, as Norway does not have census regarding race or ethnicity. However, Norway collects data on migrants up to the second generation, which can be used to accurately estimate the effective Black population.

The East Slavic and West Balkan states along with Turkey have negligible populations of Black people, numbering fewer than 40,000 all together; primarily composed of foreign students from Africa mostly in universities in Turkey and Russia.

All together, from these estimates and statistics there are roughly 9,6 million Black people in Europe, with over two-thirds from the United Kingdom or France.

If North Africans, who are of Berber or Arab ancestry, were to be included, this estimate would double to nearly 22 million.

More than 1,000,000 sub-Saharan Africans had settled in Europe between 2010 and 2017.

See also 
 African admixture in Europe
 African immigration to Europe
 White Africans of European ancestry

References

Sources 
Claudy Siar délégué interministériel à l'égalité des chances, Baptême médiatique difficile pour le nouveau délégué interministériel, François-Xavier Guillerm(agence de presse GHM), 1er avril 2011. » [archive], sur Blog France-Antille de François-Xavier Guillerm [archive]

African diaspora in Europe
People of African descent